Lewis "Tom" Thomas Leyton Gettinger (December 11, 1868 – July 26, 1943) was an American professional baseball player who played two seasons for the St. Louis Brown Stockings and one season with the Louisville Colonels.
He was born in Baltimore, Maryland and died at the age of 74 in Pensacola, Florida.

External links

1868 births
1943 deaths
19th-century baseball players
St. Louis Brown Stockings players
Louisville Colonels players
Major League Baseball outfielders
Baseball players from Baltimore
Birmingham Barons players
Jackson Senators players
York White Roses players
Reading Pretzels players
Johnstown Johnnies players
Gulfport-Biloxi Sand Crabs players
Shamokin Maroons players